Tequixtepec may refer to:

San Miguel Tequixtepec
San Pedro y San Pablo Tequixtepec